Tennessee Wine and Spirits Retailers Association v. Thomas, No. 18-96, 588 U.S. ___ (2019), was a United States Supreme Court case which held that Tennessee's two-year durational-residency requirement applicable to retail liquor store license applicants violated the Commerce Clause (Dormant Commerce Clause) and was not authorized by the Twenty-first Amendment.

Background 
The state of Tennessee imposed a series of durational-residency requirements on all people and businesses seeking to obtain or renew a license to operate a liquor store. This included a two-year durational-residency requirement for applicants of initial licenses. Total Wine & More applied to open a store in Knoxville, Tennessee which the state intended to approve based on the state Attorney General's opinion that the residency requirements were unenforceable. The trade group representing existing retailers sued the state to prevent approval.

The United States Court of Appeals for the Sixth Circuit struck down all of the provisions as violations of the Commerce Clause. Tennessee Wine and Spirits Retailers Association petitioned the ruling pertaining to the two-year residency requirement. Case was heard by the Supreme Court of the United States.

Issue 
Does Tennessee's two-year residency requirement for the obtaining of a liquor license violate the Commerce Clause of the United States Constitution?

Ruling 
The Court applies the principle known as the "Dormant Commerce Clause" or "negative Commerce Clause" which prohibits state laws that unduly restrict interstate commerce. The Court upheld the 6th Circuit ruling, striking down the two-year provision as unconstitutional.

References

External links
 
 Case page at SCOTUSblog

United States Constitution Article One case law
United States Supreme Court cases
United States Commerce Clause case law
United States Supreme Court cases of the Roberts Court
2019 in United States case law
United States Twenty-first Amendment case law
Residency
History of Knoxville, Tennessee
United States Dormant Commerce Clause case law